Pat McGee is the name of:

 Patricia McGee (1934–2005), American politician
 Pat McGee (musician) (born 1973), American singer-songwriter
 Pat McGee (baseball) (died 1889),baseball player
 Patti McGee (born 1945), skateboarder